is a dam in Minakami, in the Gunma Prefecture of Japan, completed in 1973.

References 

Dams in Gunma Prefecture
Dams completed in 1973